The Townsend Hotel is a luxury boutique hotel located in the Metro Detroit city of Birmingham, Michigan. The hotel contains the Rugby Grille restaurant. In addition, the hotel ballroom can accommodate conferences of up to 500 people. The hotel architecture is in the English manor house style.

Reception
The hotel has received several awards, including the AAA Four Diamond Award, Travel and Leisure Magazine's Worlds Best Award, and Forbes Four Star Award.

References

 

Hotels in Michigan